The Westland WS-51 Dragonfly helicopter was built by Westland Aircraft and was an Anglicised licence-built version of the American Sikorsky S-51.

Design and development

On 19 January 1947 an agreement was signed between Westland Aircraft and Sikorsky to allow a British version of the S-51 to be manufactured under licence in the United Kingdom. These would be powered by the 500 hp Alvis Leonides radial engine. A modified version was also developed by Westland as the Westland Widgeon, but it was commercially unsuccessful.

After delays caused by the need to modify and convert American-drawings to reflect British-sourced items and to replace the engine with a British-built Alvis Leonides 50, the prototype was first flown from Yeovil on 5 October 1948 piloted by Alan Bristow. Only 16 months had elapsed since work had begun on building the prototype registered G-AKTW.

After evaluation initial orders for the British military were placed, thirteen Dragonfly HR.1s for the Royal Navy and three Dragonfly HC.2s for the Royal Air Force.

Operational history

A total of seventy-two Dragonfly helicopters entered service with the Fleet Air Arm of the Royal Navy in the training, air-sea rescue and communications roles. The first unit to be equipped with them was 705 Naval Air Squadron, which is believed to be the first all-helicopter squadron to be formed outside of the United States. A Dragonfly led the helicopter section of the flypast at the Coronation Review of the Fleet in 1953. 

A planned upgrade the navy's Dragonflies to the Widgeon standard with a larger cabin, to be known as the Dragonfly HR.7, was dropped in 1957 due to defence cuts. It was replaced in British service by the Westland Whirlwind, another derivative of a Sikorsky design, in the late 1950s. Dragonflies were used in relief operations in the North Sea flood of 1953 and a number were used by the Royal Air Force for casualty evacuation during the Malayan Emergency.
 
Fifty-one civilian WS-51s were produced. Examples were used by Pest Control Ltd for crop spraying and others were flown as executive transports by Silver City Airways, Evening Standard Newspapers and Fairey Aviation. Exported aircraft operated in Japan, Belgian Congo, Mexico and Norway.

Variants

Westland/Sikorsky WS-51
Prototype.
Dragonfly HR.1
Air-sea search and rescue helicopter for the Royal Navy powered by a  Alvis 50 radial piston engine. 13 built, some modified later as HR.5s.
Dragonfly HC.2
Casualty evacuation helicopter for the Royal Air Force similar to the commercial Mark 1A, 2 built and one-conversion from a civil Mark 1A.
Dragonfly HR.3
Air-sea search and rescue helicopter for the Royal Navy. Similar to the Dragonfly HR.1, but fitted with all-metal rotor blades, 71 built some later modified as HR.5s.
Dragonfly HC.4
Casualty evacuation helicopter for the RAF similar to the Dragonfly HR.3 with all-metal rotor blades, 12 built.
Dragonfly HR.5
Air-sea search and rescue helicopter for the Royal Navy with Alvis Leonides 23/1 engine and updated to instruments and avionics. 25 modified from HR.1 and HR.3.
Westland-Sikorsky WS-51 Mk.1A
Civil transport helicopter powered by a 520 hp (388 kW) Alvis Leonides 521/1 radial piston engine, 36 built.
Westland-Sikorsky WS-51 Mk.1B
Civil transport helicopter powered by a 450 hp (336 kW) Pratt & Whitney R-985 Wasp Junior B4 radial piston engine, 15 built.

Operators

Military and government operators

Royal Ceylon Air Force - two Mk 1As

 Egyptian Air Force - two Mk 1Bs

 Royal Iraqi Air Force - three delivered in 1951

 Italian Air Force - two Mk 1As

 Royal Thai Air Force - three Mk 1As

 Royal Air Force - 15 HC.2 and HC.4)
 Far East CASEVAC Flight RAF
 No. 194 Squadron RAF
 Royal Navy
 Britannia Royal Naval College
 700 Naval Air Squadron
 701 Naval Air Squadron
 705 Naval Air Squadron
 727 Naval Air Squadron
 728 Naval Air Squadron
 744 Naval Air Squadron
 771 Naval Air Squadron

 SFR Yugoslav Air Force - 10 Mk 1Bs

Civil operators

 Sabena

 Tohoku Electric Power

 British European Airways
 Silver City Airways

Surviving aircraft
Australia
 WG725 – HR.3 under restoration at the Fleet Air Arm Museum in Nowra, New South Wales.
Brazil
 On display at the Museu Eduardo André Matarazzo in Bebedouro, São Paulo.
Japan
 JA7014"Kitakami" used in Tohoku Electric Power at the Misawa Aviation & Science Museum in Misawa, Aomori.
Malta
 VZ962 – HR.1 under restoration at the Malta Aviation Museum in Ta'Qali, Attard.
Netherlands
 WG752 – HR.5 on static display at the Aviodrome in Lelystad, Flevoland.
Serbia
 11503 – Mk.1B on static display at the Aeronautical Museum Belgrade in Surčin, Belgrade.
Sri Lanka
 CH501 – Mk.1A on static display at the Sri Lanka Air Force Museum in Ratmalana, Western Province.
Thailand
 H1-4/96 – Mk.1A on static display at the Royal Thai Air Force Museum in Don Mueang, Bangkok.
United Kingdom
 VX595 – HR.5 on static display at the Fleet Air Arm Museum in Yeovil, Somerset.
 WG719 – HR.5 on static display at The Helicopter Museum in Weston-super-Mare, Somerset.
 WG724 – HR.5 on static display at the North East Aircraft Museum in Sunderland, Tyne and Wear.
 WG751 – HR.5 on static display at the Chatham Historic Dockyard in Chatham, Kent.
 WH991 – HR.5 on static display at the Yorkshire Air Museum in Elvington, York.
 WN493 – HR.5 on static display at the Fleet Air Arm Museum in Yeovilton, Somerset.
 WN499 – HR.5 under restoration at South Yorkshire Aircraft Museum in Doncaster, South Yorkshire.
 WP495 – HR.5 on static display at Morayvia in Kinloss, Moray.
Venezuela
 HR.3 on static display at the Museo Aeronáutico de Maracay in Maracay, Aragua.

Specifications (WS-51 Mk.1A)

See also

Notes

References

Citations

Bibliography

External links

 Westland Dragonfly entry in the helis.com database
 Pictorial of a Westland Dragonfly Restoration.

Military helicopters
1950s British military utility aircraft
1950s British helicopters
Dragonfly
Aircraft first flown in 1948
Single-engined piston helicopters